Concordia is a city in and the county seat of Cloud County, Kansas, United States.  It is located along the Republican River in the Smoky Hills region of the Great Plains in North Central Kansas.  As of the 2020 census, the population of the city was 5,111.  Concordia is home of the Cloud County Community College and the Nazareth Convent and Academy.

History

19th century

Concordia holds the distinction of being elected the county seat before the town was created.  The founder of the town, James M. Hagaman had created a complete layout of the town on paper including streets, blocks, courthouse, and parks.  The name "Concordia" was chosen because a member of the early group of promoters ("Cap" Snyder) had once lived in Concordia, Missouri, and liked the name because it paid homage to the settlers-to-be's German heritage; the name "Concordia" is a German name found in many early Germanic poems.

December 1869 was the first election for the county seat with Concordia, Clyde, and the now defunct town Sibley. Without a clear majority, a second election was held between Concordia and Sibley on January 4, 1870.  Concordia was declared the winner over Sibley 165 votes to 129.

It was over a year later when Concordia officially became a community when the Republican Land District Office opened on January 16, 1871.  The Concordia Land Office continued until February 28, 1889, when it was consolidated with the land office in Topeka, Kansas.

Also in 1871, Concordia elected its first mayor, R. E. Allen. Under his leadership, Concordia was officially incorporated as a third class city under Kansas law in August 1872.

Concordia was visited in its early years by many traveling shows.  As early as 1876, various traveling entertainers including Wild Bill Hickok, Buffalo Bill Cody, Ringling Brothers, and others came to Concordia.  In 1892, the Ringling train wrecked east of the town killing two men and 20 horses, but the show played the next day to a crowd of 4,000.

The first schoolteacher to teach inside the city limits was Milo Stevens, who was paid a salary of $20 per month. A state normal school was set up in Concordia in 1874 with F. E. Robinson as principal and former state Superintendent H. D. McCarty became president the second year.  In 1876, the state ceased to provide funding and the school was closed.

In 1887, Atchison, Topeka and Santa Fe Railway built a branch line from Neva (three miles west of Strong City) through Concordia to Superior, Nebraska.  In 1996, the Atchison, Topeka and Santa Fe Railway merged with Burlington Northern Railroad and renamed to the current BNSF Railway.  Most locals still refer to this railroad as the "Santa Fe."

In 1897, Pope Leo XIII founded the Roman Catholic Diocese of Concordia, Kansas.  The diocese operated until 1947 when it was merged with the Roman Catholic Diocese of Salina.  It was later restored as a titular see in 1995.

20th century
Carrie Nation visited Concordia in the early 1900s.  Records are mixed, but the date is placed between 1908 and 1910. The Concordia Blade newspaper (now the Concordia Blade-Empire) reported:
"Carrie Nation is in town. That wonderfully brave little woman who started the crusade against Kansas saloons lectured at the M.E. Church this afternoon, and will talk again tonight at the courthouse. While in this city she is the guest of Mrs. George Mohr."

A major geographic change in the city and the area occurred on July 9, 1902. The Republican River flooded near town and broke a dam.  The flooding resulted in re-routing the river by 1/4 of a mile.

The year of 1912 brought a major blizzard to Concordia with snow so deep that a Union Pacific train became stuck northeast of town and snowbanks on main street piled as high as peoples' heads. Also in 1912, the first official inspection team for Meridian Highway (now US-81) came through Concordia on their tour from Canada to Mexico.  In 1913, the Missouri Pacific Railway depot was rebuilt after a fire destroyed the old building.

Another flood took place on June 20, 1915.  Damage from the flood was significant but not as wide-sweeping as the flood of 1902.

Geography
Concordia is located at  (39.569035, −97.658398) and is at an elevation of 1,378 feet (420 m). It lies on the south side of the Republican River in the Smoky Hills region of the Great Plains. Lost Creek, a tributary of the Republican, flows north along the western edge of the city.

Climate
Concordia has a humid continental climate (Köppen Dfa), with hot, humid summers and cold, dry winters; it is part of USDA Hardiness zone 6a. The average window for freezing temperatures is October 15 thru April 18, allowing a growing season of 179 days.

Demographics

According to the census ( estimate), Concordia is the most populous city in the county and of all six adjacent counties.

2010 census
As of the census of 2010, there were 5,395 people, 2,186 households, and 1,301 families residing in the city. The racial makeup of the city was 95.3% White, 0.8% African American, 0.4% Native American, 0.2% Asian, 1.4% from other races, and 1.9% from two or more races. Hispanic or Latino of any race were 4.3% of the population.

There were 2,186 households, of which 28.1% had children under the age of 18 living with them, 45.6% were married couples living together, 9.6% had a female householder with no husband present, 4.3% had a male householder with no wife present, and 40.5% were non-families. 34.2% of all households were made up of individuals, and 15.9% had someone living alone who was 65 years of age or older. The average household size was 2.26 and the average family size was 2.86.

The median age in the city was 38.7 years. 22.3% of residents were under the age of 18; 14.2% were between the ages of 18 and 24; 20.2% were from 25 to 44; 23.3% were from 45 to 64; and 20.1% were 65 years of age or older. The gender makeup of the city was 47.7% male and 52.3% female.

2000 census
As of the census of 2000, there were 5,714 people, 2,310 households, and 1,399 families residing in the city. The racial makeup of the city was 97.90% White, 0.58% African American, 0.25% Native American, 0.39% Asian, 0.14% from other races, and 0.75% from two or more races. Hispanic or Latino of any race were 0.74% of the population.

There were 2,310 households, out of which 26.7% had children under the age of 18 living with them, 49.3% were married couples living together, 8.1% had a female householder with no husband present, and 39.4% were non-families. 33.6% of all households were made up of individuals, and 16.4% had someone living alone who was 65 years of age or older. The average household size was 2.24 and the average family size was 2.88.

In the city, the population was spread out, with 21.3% under the age of 18, 13.5% from 18 to 24, 21.9% from 25 to 44, 19.9% from 45 to 64, and 23.4% who were 65 years of age or older. The median age was 40 years. For every 100 females, there were 83.6 males. For every 100 females age 18 and over, there were 79.0 males.

The median income for a household in the city was $31,398, and the median income for a family was $40,389. Males had a median income of $27,764 versus $20,885 for females. The per capita income for the city was $17,019. About 7.1% of families and 12.9% of the population were below the poverty line, including 15.3% of those under age 18 and 10.1% of those age 65 or over.

Government

City government
The Concordia city government consists of five commissioners, of which one is elected mayor each year by the other four members.  The commission meets the 1st and 3rd Wednesday of each month at 5:30PM.  Other government facilities include city services such as water, sewer, police, and fire departments.

Other government services
Concordia holds other government services in its city limits.  The town is home to various county services such as the county sheriff and county court house as well as state government buildings including an armory for the Kansas National Guard.  There also are federal offices and buildings common to small communities such as the United States Post Office.

Education

Colleges and universities
Concordia is the location of Cloud County Community College, a two-year junior college.  Other post-secondary schools in Concordia's history are Concordia Normal School and Concordia Business College.

Primary and secondary education
The community is served by Concordia USD 333 public school district. Education for grades K-6 are completed in the district across several buildings.  Public secondary education for grades 7-12 is completed at Concordia Junior-Senior High School. Class sizes typically range between 80 and 120 students. The school district also runs the Cloud County Alternative High School, primarily for area non-traditional students.  Students can earn their diploma online or through computer-based classes.  Enrollment is very small, typically graduating less than ten students each year.

The Catholic Church in Concordia operated Notre Dame High School a private Catholic High School from 1962 to 1969.  It remained open as a Catholic grade school until 1971, when the local district purchased the property and has used it for fifth and sixth grades under the name Concordia Middle School.

Libraries
Concordia is home to the Frank Carlson Library, a public library named for former Kansas governor Frank Carlson. Other public libraries in Concordia's history include the Carnegie Library, built with a $10,000 donation from Andrew Carnegie in 1908.

Transportation
Concordia is the host of Blosser Municipal Airport (CNK).  Blosser Municipal Airport is publicly owned by the City of Concordia.  The National Weather Service and the Kansas National Guard maintain facilities at this location.

Media
The Concordia Blade-Empire is the official county newspaper and publishes its edition five days a week from its location in Concordia.

Radio stations KNCK (1390 AM) and KNCK-FM (94.9 FM) operate from the same broadcasting facility in Concordia and are privately owned.  Radio station KVCO (88.3 FM) operates as a broadcast journalism project by Cloud County Community College in Concordia.  KVCO is publicly owned and operated by the school.

Culture

Points of interest

In November 1905, Concordia resident Colonel Napoleon Bonaparte Brown announced to the townspeople his plans to build the Brown Grand Theatre, a fully outfitted opera house for Concordia.  Renowned Kansas City theater architect Carl Boller was hired to prepare the design drawings and the blueprints. Restored to its original 1907 state, the 650 seat Brown Grand Theatre now serves as a tourist attraction and performing arts/community center for Concordia and North Central Kansas.

Camp Concordia, a prisoner of war camp for captured Germans, was maintained a few miles north of Concordia during World War II. The original guard house remains and has been restored.

The Cloud County Historical Museum preserves and exhibits objects and documents of historical items representing early-day Kansas. It is housed in the former 1908 Andrew Carnegie Library building and a large newer annex. Cloud County, Kansas artifacts exhibited for viewing include items relating to nature, radio, railroads, quilts, photography, toys, vintage clothing and furniture, musical instruments, fossils, tools, and stained glass.  The museum is also home of one of the largest hand carved brick murals. Records are on display of the military Prisoner of War Camp, churches, organizations, schools, and businesses. Displays of glass cutting, rare coins and books, rock and gem shop, micro-film of county newspapers and many others too numerous to list. Large displays in the annex include the 1908 Lincoln-Page Airplane, an 1898 Holsman belt driven horseless carriage, and a 1915 Ford Model T.

The Cloud County Veterans Memorial is housed in the courthouse block of Concordia.  The memorial includes an "eternal flame" that has been burning since the monument was established on November 11, 1968.

Concordia is the home of the national Orphan Train complex, housed in the restored historic Union Pacific Railroad Depot.  The complex currently houses a museum and research center dedicated to the preservation of the stories and artifacts of those who were part of the Orphan Train Movement from 1854 to 1929.

The Nazareth Convent and Academy is the official Motherhouse and Home for the 260 Sisters of St. Joseph of Concordia. It was built in 1903 and is listed in the National Register of Historic Places. The sisters at Nazareth earned a reputation for their education of young women, giving them a sound academic program and instruction in the fine arts, music, French, and the social graces. In 1903, the Sisters of St. Joseph entered the health care field in Concordia with the establishment of the St. Joseph Hospital on the original site after the new Nazareth Motherhouse was built at its present location.

The most common historic bridge visited is the Republican River Pegram Truss, a three-span through truss bridge built in 1893 for the Union Pacific Railway.  As of 2007, the bridge is used for local automobile traffic.  Other bridges in the area are the County Line Bowstring bridge near Hollis and the Pott's Ford Bridge near Glasco.  All three bridges are listed on the National Register of Historic Places.

Concordia claims the title "The Stained Glass Capital of Kansas" and a tour of local stained glass pieces has been established.  Although common in houses of worship, many private residences also have quality stained glass installed and available for viewing on the tour.

Parks and recreation
Small game hunting (particularly game birds such as pheasant, quail, and dove) attracts a large number of people from all over the world.  Opening Day of hunting season is an especially active day for Concordia as it brings a large number of visitors and a boost to the local economy.

The city of Concordia has complementary overnight camping available at Airport Park, one of several city parks.  Airport Park is located at the Blosser Municipal Airport.

Notable people

Academic
 George Norlin, former president of the University of Colorado.

Arts/Entertainment
 Jim Garver, guitarist for Garth Brooks
 Robert E. Pearson, movie director
 Marilyn Schreffler, American actress who provided voice-overs for several animated TV programs
 Helen Talbot, motion picture actress and pin-up girl.  Born Helen Darling in Concordia.
 The Sensational Showmen, Rock show band from 1964 to 1968, inducted into Kansas Music Hall of Fame in 2009.

Business/Politics
 Charles H. Blosser, local businessman and namesake of Blosser Municipal Airport in Concordia
 Napoleon Bonaparte Brown, local businessman and philanthropist, namesake of the Brown Grand Theatre in Concordia
 Frank Carlson, former Congressman, Senator, and Governor of Kansas
 Deanell Reece Tacha, chief judge of the U.S. Court of Appeals for the Tenth Circuit
 Clyde Short, former Chairman of the Kansas Democratic Party

Religion
 Most Reverend Charles Joseph Chaput, OFM Cap, archbishop of the Roman Catholic Archdiocese of Philadelphia, Pennsylvania
 Right Rev. John Francis Cunningham, Bishop of Concordia
 Constantine Scollen famous missionary priest was resident from 1896 until 1898
 Jim Garlow, pastor of Skyline Church in La Mesa, California.  Garlow is often cited as an evangelical leader in the political arena

Sports
 Tom Brosius, track and field athlete
 Greg Brummett, baseball player in 1990s, pitched for San Francisco Giants and Minnesota Twins; head baseball coach at Cloud County Community College
 Keith Christensen, former NFL football player New Orleans Saints
 Billy Dewell, former NFL football player Chicago Cardinals
 Bill Dotson, track and field athlete
 Mike Gardner, head football coach at Tabor College and Malone University
 Larry Hartshorn, former NFL football player Chicago Cardinals
 Tim McCarty, head football coach at East Central University
 Ernie Quigley, professional basketball referee and umpire in Major League Baseball; member Basketball Hall of Fame
 Harry Short, Texas League baseball player
 Shanele Stires, former WNBA basketball player Minnesota Lynx and college basketball coach
 Kaye Vaughan, former Canadian Football League and Hall of Fame player with Ottawa Rough Riders, winner CFL's Outstanding Lineman Award

Other
 Boston Corbett, Union American Civil War soldier, famous for shooting John Wilkes Booth, the man who assassinated Abraham Lincoln
 Pop Hollinger, one of the first comic book collectors of all time

Popular culture
The song Friends in Low Places made famous by Garth Brooks mentions a bar called "The Oasis" that is named after a now-closed establishment in Concordia.

Image gallery

Notes

References

Further reading

 Bell, Rachel Lowrey (1998a).  A Proud Past... A Pictorial History of Concordia, Kansas; D-Books Publishing.
 Emery, Janet Pease (1970a). It Takes People to Make a Town; Arrow Printing Company; LCCN 75-135688.

External links

 
 Concordia - Directory of Public Officials
 Concordia - Chamber of Commerce
 , from Hatteberg's People on KAKE TV news
 Concordia city map, KDOT

Cities in Kansas
County seats in Kansas
Cities in Cloud County, Kansas
Populated places established in 1871
1871 establishments in Kansas